Sallagrazhdë or  is a settlement in the Suva Reka municipality of Kosovo. It has a homogeneous Albanian population. In the 2011 census, it had 1,388 inhabitants.

Demographics

Notes

References

Villages in Suva Reka